The Mafuta is a diamond-mining ship owned and operated by De Beers in the western coast of South Africa. Built in 1983 as Dock Express 20 for Dock Express Shipping (later Dockwise), the semisubmersible, multirole, heavy-lift vessel was converted to the world's largest cable layer in 1993. In 2005, she was purchased by De Beers, and converted to a subsea diamond-mining ship by A&P Tyne over the course of 11 months. The ship's new name, Peace in Africa, may have implied that it was providing an alternative to blood diamonds. In 2013, still under ownership of De Beers Marine Namibia, the vessel was renamed to MV Mafuta.

Construction
Then named Dock Express 20, the ship's keel was laid in 1982 in the Netherlands at Verolme Shipyard Heusden, and it was launched the following year.

The ship's gross tonnage, a measure of the volume of all its enclosed spaces, is 14,793 m3. Its net tonnage, which measures the volume of the cargo spaces, is 4,437 m3.

Dock Express 20 was powered by two Stork-Werkspoor 6TM410 four-stroke, medium-speed, marine diesel engines of  apiece. Each engine powered an independent controllable-pitch propeller. For harbour maneuvering, the vessel was also fitted with a 625 kW bow thruster. In addition, the ship has two  auxiliary generators to provide shipboard electrical power. When the Dock Express 20 was converted to a dynamically positioned cable ship, she was refitted with three  azimuth thrusters to serve as its main propulsion.

Dock Express 20 was originally built to house 24 crewmembers, but that number was more than tripled in the 1993 conversion.  In 2007, the ship was converted again to work as a dredger, increasing the gross tonnage to 15,854, and the deadweight tonnage to 7,935 long tons.

Career

Early career 
Dock Express 20 was built for use in the offshore oil industry.

Following an engine failure, the heavy seas pushed the tugboat against one of the protruding stern sponsons of the heavy-lift vessel, causing enough damage to sink the vessel in 25 minutes. The crew evacuated to a life raft and was picked up by another ship.

Cable layer 
The ship was converted to a cable layer by Tyco Submarine Systems, and worked under charter to this company.

Dock Express 20 is pictured on the Russian postcard commemorating a submarine cable between Denmark and Russia. The ship laid a  cable from Copenhagen to Kingiseppe, which connects via microwave to Moscow and St. Petersburg.

Dock Express 20 was one of three ships that worked on the northern section of the Pacific Crossing-1 (PC-1) system cable, linking the United States and Japan. It also laid telecommunications cable between San Francisco and Guam.

Diamond mining 

As of 2011, Peace in Africa was operating off the coast of Namaqualand in underwater diamond mining. Its ML3 mining license, according to a 2007 report, began about 5 km offshore of Kleinzee, running north to Alexander Bay, Northern Cape, and extended seaward for 17–32 km. Prior to 2007, the ship had operated in the neighboring Atlantic 1 licence area in Namibia, which contained higher-quality diamonds.

The dredging equipment aboard Peace in Africa includes a 240-ton crawler, described as "a large undersea tracked mining tool" connected to the ship by a 655-mm internal diameter rubber hose, and a "diamond recovery treatment plant" built by Bateman Engineering. The dredge has a suction capacity of about 10,000 m3 of water and gravel per hour, resulting in about 250 tons of material to be processed for diamonds. The anticipated yield is around 60 diamonds per hour, or roughly 240,000 carats annually.

Peace in Africa was the second-largest ship registered in South Africa, and worked on a continuous, round-the-clock basis, as of 2007. Its mining operation was projected to have a lifespan of 19 years.

As of 2006, De Beers Marine Namibia was operating five mining vessels, including Peace in Africa.

Peace in Africa appeared in a 2009 episode of the Discovery Channel's documentary series Mighty Ships.

In 2013, still under ownership of De Beers Marine Namibia, the vessel was renamed to MV Mafuta.

References

External links 
 Ubergizmo field trip to visit Peace in Africa
 Mighty Ships episode on Peace in Africa, Discovery Channel
 Marinetraffic

1983 ships
Heavy lift ships
Cable laying ships
Dredgers
Ships built in the Netherlands
De Beers
Diamond industry in South Africa
Mining in Namibia
Namaqualand
Underwater mining